Andromeda Spaceways Inflight Magazine or ASIM is a fantasy and science fiction magazine published out of Canberra, ACT, Australia.  The publishers of ASIM describe it as "Australia's Pulpiest SF Magazine".  The magazine is currently edited by Andromeda Spaceways Publishing Incorporated and is published quarterly. Although originally sold only in Australia, subscriptions for ASIM are now available worldwide through Amazon.com and other online vendors.

History
The first issue of Andromeda Spaceways Inflight Magazine was released in June 2002 as a slightly larger than digest size print magazine.  Although the publishers of ASIM continued to offer it as a print magazine, in April 2006 they began releasing an electronic PDF version of the magazine beginning with issue #22.  In June 2007 ASIM released a series of "best of" anthologies in the PDF format.  There are a total of three anthologies in the series; one for science fiction, one for fantasy and one for horror.  As of issue #54 eBook versions also became available. As of Issue #64, in September 2016, the magazine name was simplified to Andromeda Spaceways Magazine, the magazine banner was modernised, and all issues became electronic only, with an annual print 'Best of' collection. As of January 2020, Andromeda Spaceways Magazine has published a total of 77 issues.

Awards and recognition
The launch of Andromeda Spaceways Inflight Magazine won a Ditmar Award in 2003 as the "Best Australian Production", and two stories published in the magazine tied for the Sir Julius Vogel Award in 2004 as "Best Short Story". In addition the magazine and works published in it have been nominated for twelve Ditmar and five Aurealis Award. In 2008 ASIM won a special Sir Julius Vogel Award for services to New Zealand science fiction.

Notable authors
Notable authors published in the magazine include:

Lee Battersby
 Simon Brown
David Conyers
Shane Jiraiya Cummings
Stephen Dedman
Jennifer Fallon
Dirk Flinthart
Paul Haines
Simon Haynes
Tom Holt
Rick Kennett
 Ken Liu
Martin Livings
Stephen Marley
Will McIntosh
Sean McMullen
 Mike O'Driscoll
Nike Sulway
 Liz Williams
 Sean Williams

Reviews
 Many issues of ASIM have been reviewed at Tangent Short Fiction Review.

References

External links
 Andromeda Spaceways Magazine

2002 establishments in Australia
Quarterly magazines published in Australia
Fantasy fiction magazines
Horror fiction magazines
Magazines established in 2002
Mass media in Canberra
Science fiction digests
Science fiction magazines
Science fiction magazines established in the 2000s
Science fiction webzines